The Caribe Hilton International also called the Caribe Hilton International Championships was a men's and women's tennis tournament played outdoors on hard courts from 1953 to 1972. The womens editions from 1971 to 1972 was known as the Caribe Hilton Invitational.

History
The Caribe Hilton International was established in 1954 and was played at the Caribe Hilton Hotel, San Juan, Puerto Rico until 1968. The tournament was played outdoors on hard courts. The Caribe Hilton Championships was organized as part of a spring (March to May) Caribbean Circuit which included tournaments in Jamaica (Kingston International Invitation), Venezuela (Altamira International), Trinidad and Tobago (Trinidad International) and Colombia, Colombian International (Ciudad de Barranquilla). the tournament attracted the top players of the day. The 1971 and 1972 editions of the women's event was known as the Caribe Hilton Invitation.

Champions
Included:

Men's singles
Note: Two editions of the mens tournament were held in 1968 the first in * January, the other in ** April.

Women's Singles
(incomplete roll)

Women's Doubles

References

External links
 WTA Results Archive

Hard court tennis tournaments
Tennis tournaments in Puerto Rico
WTA Tour
Recurring sporting events established in 1953
Recurring sporting events disestablished in 1973
Defunct tennis tournaments in Puerto Rico
Hilton Worldwide
Defunct sports competitions in Puerto Rico
1953 establishments in Puerto Rico
1970s disestablishments in Puerto Rico